The "Hayya Hayya" is played at the beginning of AFC-structured football matches and tournaments since the 2015 AFC Asian Cup, usually as players enter the field.

Tarikhche 
Lee Dong-june composed this anthem in 2014.

It was first played at the 2015 AFC Asian Cup, before 2015 AFC Asian Cup, AFC-structured football matches and tournaments adopted FIFA Anthem.

See also 
 Salam Farmandeh

References

External links 
 Making of AFC Anthem

Asian Football Confederation music
Association football anthems
Association football events official songs and anthems
European anthems
Anthems of organizations
Association football songs and chants